Jana Novotná won in the final 6–1, 7–5 against Arantxa Sánchez Vicario. The two had reached the final the previous year but the match was cancelled in the first set due to persistent rain. Novotná went on to win the Wimbledon title two weeks later.

Seeds
A champion seed is indicated in bold text while text in italics indicates the round in which that seed was eliminated. The top four seeds received a bye to the second round.

  Jana Novotná (champion)
  Steffi Graf (quarterfinals)
  Arantxa Sánchez Vicario (final)
  Venus Williams (second round)
  Irina Spîrlea (quarterfinals)
  Anna Kournikova (semifinals)
  Nathalie Tauziat (first round)
  Ai Sugiyama (second round)

Draw

Final

Section 1

Section 2

External links
 1998 Direct Line International Championships Draw

Eastbourne International
1998 WTA Tour